Following is a list of senators of New Caledonia, people who have represented the territory of New Caledonia in the Senate of France.

Fifth Republic
Senators for New Caledonia under the French Fifth Republic were/are:

Fourth Republic 
Senators for New Caledonia under the French Fourth Republic were:

References

Sources

 
Lists of members of the Senate (France) by department